ISO 19114 Geographic information - Quality evaluation procedures provides a procedural framework for evaluating the quality of digital geographic datasets, consistent with the data quality principles defined in ISO 19113. It consists of three classes of conformance: one for quality evaluation, one for evaluating data quality and on for reporting quality information. It is an international standard developed by the International Organization for Standardization.
This standard has been withdrawn and been revised by ISO 19157.

See also
ISO/TC 211

Source document
 ISO 19114:2003

External links
 International Organization for Standardization
 Association for Geographic Information
 Project Management and Mapping AS

19114
Geographic information systems